Tiago Jorge Oliveira Lopes (born 4 January 1989) is a Portuguese professional footballer who plays as a right-back.

Club career
Born in Vila Nova de Gaia, Porto District, Lopes kickstarted his senior career in Italian amateur football. Returned to his country in 2010, he spent one season apiece in the third division with S.C. Espinho and C.D. Tondela.

In the summer of 2012, Lopes signed with Segunda Liga club C.D. Trofense. He played his first game as a professional on 12 August, featuring the full 90 minutes in a 2–0 away loss against C.D. Aves.

Lopes joined fellow league side S.C. Covilhã for the 2013–14 campaign. On 19 January 2014, as his contract was about to expire, the 25-year-old moved abroad after agreeing to a two-and-a-half-year deal at CFR Cluj in the Romanian Liga I. He scored his first top-flight goal on 29 September 2014, the game's only in a home win over FC Universitatea Cluj.

In July 2017, Lopes moved on a free transfer to Kayserispor in Turkey's Süper Lig, on a one-year deal with the option of a second. After two years of regular game time, he transferred to Denizlispor in the same competition, on a contract of the same length.

Personal life
Lopes's twin brother, Hélder, was also a footballer and a defender.

Honours
CFR Cluj
Cupa României: 2015–16

References

External links

1989 births
Living people
Portuguese twins
Twin sportspeople
Sportspeople from Vila Nova de Gaia
Portuguese footballers
Association football defenders
Liga Portugal 2 players
Segunda Divisão players
Padroense F.C. players
S.C. Espinho players
C.D. Tondela players
C.D. Trofense players
S.C. Covilhã players
Liga I players
CFR Cluj players
Süper Lig players
TFF First League players
Kayserispor footballers
Denizlispor footballers
Portugal youth international footballers
Portuguese expatriate footballers
Expatriate footballers in Italy
Expatriate footballers in Romania
Expatriate footballers in Turkey
Portuguese expatriate sportspeople in Italy
Portuguese expatriate sportspeople in Romania
Portuguese expatriate sportspeople in Turkey